Gladstone is an unincorporated layover in Union County, New Mexico, United States, founded in 1880. It lies at the intersection of US Route 56 and Union County Road C001. The post office, which opened in 1888, closed in 2010, leaving only a general store with gas service, and two houses, located there. The rest of the community has reverted to private ranch land.

History
Gladstone was founded in 1880 by William H. Harris, an Englishman, who hoped to set up a Utopian religious community called "Gladstone Colony".  He named it in honor of William Ewart Gladstone, a Liberal politician and the British Prime Minister at the time.  A fair number of settlers came to Gladstone, but many left disillusioned shortly thereafter.

References

Unincorporated communities in Union County, New Mexico
Unincorporated communities in New Mexico